The Algeria national boxing team represents Algeria at the international boxing competitions such as Olympic Games or World Boxing Championships.

Medal count
Algeria has 12 participations in the Summer Olympic of 27 editions held from 1896 to 2016.

List of medalists at Olympic Games

List of medalists at World Championships

List of medalists at World Combat Games

List of medalists at Mediterranean Games

List of medalists at African Games

List of medalists at African Championships

List of medalists at Afro-Asian Games

List of medalists at Pan Arab Games

See also 
Algeria at the Olympics

References

External links
Athletics at Summer Olympics

National team
boxing